Arden VanAmringe Myrin is an American actress and comedian. Myrin was a cast member on the Netflix series Insatiable, playing the role of Regina Sinclair, and starred in the world premiere of Steve Martin's play Meteor Shower at the Long Wharf Theatre. Her television credits include Insecure, Grey's Anatomy, Conan, Orange Is the New Black, Hung, Key & Peele, Inside Amy Schumer, W/ Bob & David, Psych, Bones, Fresh Off the Boat, Suburgatory, 2 Broke Girls, Reno 911!, Shameless, and Gilmore Girls.

Myrin has appeared in many films, including the Sundance Films Bachelorette, and the Mr. Oizo films Wrong Cops and Wrong, as well as Kinsey, Morning Glory, and others.

Myrin's theater credits include Robert O'Hara's Barbecue at The Public Theater in New York City, as well as the premiere of John Ross Bowie's play about The Ramones Four Chords and A Gun at the Bootleg Theater in Los Angeles. Myrin was in the original New York City production of David Mamet's Boston Marriage at the Public Theater, and appeared in Hay Fever directed by Darko Tresnjak at the Westport Country Playhouse.

As a writer she has sold pilots to Adult Swim and MTV, and also is the author of the memoir Little Miss Little Compton. She appeared on Chelsea Lately over 100 times and was a regular panelist on @Midnight.

She was cast member of Mad TV for the last four seasons along with Keegan-Michael Key, Jordan Peele, Ike Barinholtz, and Bobby Lee. She has appeared on Late Night with Conan O'Brien, The Howard Stern Show, WTF with Marc Maron, and RuPaul's Drag Race. Myrin is also the host of the iHeartRadio podcast Will You Accept This Rose? about The Bachelor franchise and is about to debut another iHeartRadio podcast Lady of the Road celebrating female leaders with co-host Bridgerton director Julie Anne Robinson.

Early life and education
Myrin was born in Little Compton, Rhode Island, a quiet seaside village. Her father was an accountant and her mother was a real estate agent. She has an older brother, Alarik. As a child, she staged her neighborhood plays and enjoyed seeing Annie on Broadway. Myrin attended Friends Academy in Dartmouth, Massachusetts for her middle school years. She graduated from Middlesex School, in Concord, Massachusetts, for high school. She is of Swedish and Norwegian heritage.

Afterwards, Myrin attended Colorado College, a small liberal arts school, where she received a degree in theater and studio arts. She was elected commencement speaker at her graduation. During one college break, Myrin began to study improvisational comedy and worked as an intern on NBC's Late Night with Conan O'Brien, where she admits she "mostly ran the Xerox machine."

Career

Shortly after graduation, Myrin briefly moved to Chicago, where she became a member of the Improv Olympic and later re-located to New York City and Los Angeles, where she was part of the same group. One of her memorable standup comedian acts included a section of her own life experiences called Straight Outta Lil' Compton. She later wrote a book of such life experiences, called Little Miss Little Compton: A Memoir. Myrin also trained with the Los Angeles comedy troupes The Groundlings and Upright Citizens Brigade.

Mad TV
Myrin officially joined the cast of Mad TV in 2005 as a repertory performer from season 11 to its last episode on FOX in 2009 (Myrin didn't come back to the show for its revival in 2016). Notable celebrity impressions she has done include Ali Lohan, Avril Lavigne, Cindy McCain, Elisabeth Hasselbeck, Farrah Fawcett, Goldie Hawn, Heidi Montag, Helen Mirren, Hilary Duff, Jamie Lynn Spears, Jennifer Love Hewitt, Jillian Barberie, Katie Holmes, Kourtney Kardashian, Lily Allen, Lo Bosworth, Mayim Bialik, Martie Maguire (of The Chicks), Nicole Kidman, Nina Garcia, Pamela Anderson, Portia de Rossi, Reese Witherspoon, and Tara Reid.

Personal life
On December 30, 2007, Myrin married Dan Martin, a comedy writer she first met in 2001. On June 1, 2021, Myrin announced she and Martin were divorcing via a post on her Instagram account.

Filmography

Film

Television

References

External links
 
 Arden Myrin is interviewed and performs on Radio Happy Hour
 The JV Club #87: Arden Myrin (interview) mp3

Actresses from Massachusetts
American film actresses
American television actresses
American impressionists (entertainers)
American people of Norwegian descent
American people of Swedish descent
American women comedians
Living people
Colorado College alumni
People from Little Compton, Rhode Island
Actresses from Rhode Island
20th-century American actresses
21st-century American actresses
American sketch comedians
Comedians from Rhode Island
Middlesex School alumni
20th-century American comedians
21st-century American comedians
Year of birth missing (living people)